Walter J. Koladza Airport, also known as the Great Barrington Airport, is a privately owned airport in Great Barrington, Massachusetts open to the public.  It has a single 2,579 ft runway. The airport is named after Walter J. Koladza (died September 1, 2004), who was a test pilot during World War II, and the owner of the airport for nearly 60 years.

References

External links

  

Great Barrington, Massachusetts
Airports in Berkshire County, Massachusetts
Privately owned airports